Convent of Mercy could refer to:

 Convent of Mercy, Adelaide, whose chapel was designed by architect Walter Bagot in 1920
Convent of Mercy (Mobile, Alabama)
Convent of Mercy (Pittsburgh)